Woodlawn School District 6 is a public school district based in Rison, Arkansas.

The school district encompasses  of land along U.S. Highway 63 in Cleveland County and primarily supports the communities of Woodlawn and Rye.

Schools 
 Woodlawn Elementary School, serving kindergarten through grade 6.
 Woodlawn High School, serving grades 7 through 12.

External links
 

School districts in Arkansas
Education in Cleveland County, Arkansas